Elitserien is the Swedish men's volleyball top division. By late February-early March it is followed up by the Swedish national championship playoff.

References 

Sweden
Volleyball competitions in Sweden
Professional sports leagues in Sweden